Ledegem is a municipality located in the Belgian province of West Flanders. The municipality comprises the towns of Ledegem proper,  and Sint-Eloois-Winkel. On January 1, 2006, Ledegem had a total population of 9,306. The total area is 24.76 km² which gives a population density of 376 inhabitants per km².

 is a monument/plaque at the Sint-Petruskerk to the Belgian soldiers and civilians from Ledegem who died in World War I.

References

External links
 
  

Municipalities of West Flanders